Šluknov Hook (or Böhmisches Niederland), Šluknov Spur, or Šluknov Projection is a salient region found in the northern Czech Republic along the border with Germany.

Geography
The area is part of the southern Lusatian Highlands, between the Elbe Sandstone Mountains in the west and the Lusatian Mountains in the east. It is administratively included in the northeastern Děčín District. The largest towns in the region are Varnsdorf, Rumburk, and Šluknov, after which it is named.

History
Šluknov Hook was traditionally closely connected with neighboring Saxony because it also had a German-speaking population. The expulsion of Germans from Czechoslovakia (1945–46) severed the connection when new Czech-speaking settlers arrived, creating a new linguistic border. The region did not reach pre-war population because it could not attract enough new settlers to replace the expelled German population.

Tourism
The territory has traditionally been marked by Roman Catholicism and its textile industry. It has numerous Baroque churches and corresponding cemeteries, as well as many chapels, cloisters, and places of pilgrimage. Many were built on the mountains of the region, while the great Baroque churches are found in each larger town.

Most medieval castles in the area have been destroyed or have fallen into disrepair. Impressive ruins are found in the old town centre of Šluknov and in nearby Lipová; they are awaiting further reconstruction and restoration. The wooden houses of the region, already restored for the most part, are also popular with tourists. The local infrastructure is well-constructed in order to accommodate tourists.

The region extends into Bohemian Switzerland National Park in the west; the National Park Service is located in Krásná Lípa.

References

Děčín District
Geography of the Czech Republic
Bohemia
Geography of the Ústí nad Labem Region